Hepingli Subdistrict is a subdistrict and the seat of Beishi District, in the heart of Baoding, Hebei, People's Republic of China. , it has 10 residential communities under its administration.

See also
List of township-level divisions of Hebei

References

Township-level divisions of Hebei
Lianchi District